Nidamanuru is a part of Vijayawada in NTR district of the Indian state of Andhra Pradesh. It is located in Vijayawada (rural) mandal of Vijayawada revenue division. As per the G.O. No. M.S.104 (dated:23-03-2017), Municipal Administration and Urban Development Department, it became a part of Vijayawada metropolitan area. (Total population 11,900)

Geography 
The Ryves Canal that originates from the Krishna river flows through the village and is the main source of irrigation and drinking.

Transport 
State runs APSRTC bus services from Bus stand to Nidamanuru. It lies on National Highway 16. Nidamanuru railway station serves with rail services. Nearest airport is Vijayawada international airport ( Gannavaram) which is 9KM away.

Education 

School of Planning and Architecture was established by Ministry of Human Resource Development, Government of India. ZPHS Nidamanuru was one of the best govt schools in AP. It caters to the  Enikepadu, Gudavalli etc. The school has 75yr old history to it. The literacy percentage of this town 95%. Currently Nidamanuru has couple of Intermediate pvt colleges like Narayana and Chaitanya. The town is very close to the engineering colleges like Siddhartha Engineering, PVP Siddhartha institute of technology, and SRK institute of technology. Nidamanuru has Delhi public school available for the CBSE. Reputed institutes like KKR Gowtham international school available for the residential schooling

Banks 

[Nidamanuru] has 2 major banks. SBI and AndhraBank. ICICI ATM, AndhraBank, SBI ATMs are available. 

HDFC bank is available at Enikepadu.

Industries 

Nidamanuru has Model Dairy ( Dairy products), Model steels (currently closed)( Steel products), Incap ( capacitors limited) 

Ashok Leyland, Vijayawada, and Pratap industries ( Steel and engineering products). Majority of the automotive show rooms like Volvo, Benz, Ashok leyland etc are available.

References 

Neighbourhoods in Vijayawada